Jung Yong-hwa (born June 22, 1989) is a South Korean singer, musician and actor. He is the leader, lead vocalist and rhythm guitarist of the rock band CNBLUE. Jung made his television debut in You're Beautiful (2009), and has since starred in television dramas Heartstrings (2011), Marry Him If You Dare (2013), The Three Musketeers (2014), and The Package (2017). On the music front, Jung also made his solo debut with the album One Fine Day in 2015.

Early life and career beginnings
Jung Yong-hwa was born on June 22, 1989, in Seoul, South Korea. His family consists of his parents and a brother, who is four years older. He moved to Busan in 1991 and lived there through high school, where he first began composing music. After taking his college entrance exam, he moved back to Seoul, where he joined music label FNC Music. In 2009, Jung left for Japan to study music with his bandmates. During their studies, they did street performances and released independent albums. The group debuted in Japan with the EP Now or Never on August 19, 2009, with an indie label AI Entertainment. They debuted in Korea in 2010 with the EP Bluetory.

Music career
On January 14, 2011, Jung released his first solo digital single, "For First Time Lovers". The song was featured on the second season of We Got Married, where Jung was a cast member and one half of an on-screen couple with Seohyun of Girls' Generation. Upon its release, it topped various South Korean music charts.

In 2014, he released "You, My Star", a self-composed single dedicated to his fans. All profits of the single were donated to charity.

In January 2015, Jung debuted as a solo artist with the album One Fine Day, which clinched the number one spot on the Billboard World Albums chart. The album featured artists JJ Lin, Yang Dong-geun, Verbal Jint, YB's Yoon Do-hyun and Peter Malick. One Fine Day received generally favorable reviews from music critics, who noted his growth as a singer-songwriter. Jung later embarked on his first series of solo concerts across Asia.

In 2016, Jung collaborated with Sunwoo Jung-a on a collaborative album project. The duo released two singles “Hello” and “Empathy”; Jung composed "Hello" and co-wrote the lyrics to "Empathy".

Jung reportedly collaborated with foreign artists through a songwriting camp for his first EP, titled Do Disturb. The EP along with the music video for its lead single "That Girl" were released on July 19, 2017. Jung released his second Japanese album Summer Calling on August 9, 2017.

In May 2022, Jung will hold a solo fan meeting 2022 Jung Yonghwa Fan Meeting [Painting Paper] on June 11, 2022, which will be held both offline and online.

Songwriting
Jung has composed several notable singles for CNBLUE, including "In My Head" (2011), "Where You Are" (2012) and "I'm Sorry" (2013). In particular, his composition "Can't Stop" for the group's fifth EP was very well received and earned rave reviews from critics and K-pop fans.

For his drama Heartstrings (2011), he composed and sang "Because I Miss You". The single peaked at number 14 on the Gaon Chart, and later ranked number one on Japanese ringtone charts. He also produced "Casting Love" for the soundtrack of Marry Him If You Dare (2013), which was sung by Jeon Gun-hwa.

Jung has also composed for other artists. He composed and produced "Fool" (also known as "Babo") as a gift for label-mate Juniel, which was featured on her debut album as well as  "Love is Only You" for another FNC artist, girl group AOA. Jung released 17 compositions for the first half of 2012.

As a gift for the CNBLUE School in Burkina Faso, Africa, Jung helped produce their "School Song". In 2013, Jung penned the song "Feel Good", the brand song of Samsung Galaxy, which was released on YouTube on August 23, 2013.

In January 2019, Jung was among 25 songwriters selected for the forthcoming year to become full members of the Korea Music Copyright Association (KOMCA).

Acting career

Jung Yong-hwa debuted as an actor before his band's debut in Korea. He was the first member of CNBLUE to appear on screen in 2009 when he landed his first acting role in the SBS drama You're Beautiful. The drama aired from October 7 to November 26, 2009. As the series revolves around the life of a musical group, he played the role of the lead guitarist in the faux idol band A.N.Jell. The series gained a cult following, and earned high ratings in Japan, which fostered the growth of his popularity.

In 2011, Jung was cast in MBC's youth campus drama Heartstrings, along with fellow band member Kang Min-hyuk. The drama also reunited Jung with You're Beautiful co-star Park Shin-hye. After the drama aired, Jung experienced a rise in popularity in Japan.

Originally cast in Kim Eun-sook's teen drama The Heirs, Jung revealed that he declined the role to "avoid" actress Park Shin-hye, (who was the lead actress of Heirs) despite being fascinated with the character and knowing that the drama was likely to succeed. Instead, he chose to star in KBS' romantic comedy Marry Him If You Dare. Explaining his decision, Jung said that the audience is likely to be "bored" as he had already worked with Park in two dramas.

In 2014, Jung took the leading role in period action drama The Three Musketeers. Despite suffering from low ratings, Jung received positive reviews from critics and producers for his improved acting in the series. Three Musketeers was also well received in China and fostered in Jung's growth in popularity in the country.

In 2017, Jung made his big-screen debut in the Chinese gastronomy film Cook Up a Storm alongside Nicholas Tse. The same year, Jung starred in JTBC's travel romance drama The Package with Lee Yeon-hee.

In 2020, Jung made a special appearance in the sci-fi film, P1H: The Beginning of a New World, following his military discharge in late 2019.

In 2021, Jung starred in the comedy and fantasy drama, Sell Your Haunted House alongside Jang Na-ra. He sang the first OST of the series, I Got Ya.

Variety show
After his successful acting debut, Jung joined his first variety show, MBC's Sunday Sunday Night program Korea Ecosystem Rescue Centre: Hunters, which featured seven celebrity MCs going out to capture wild boars. The show premiered on December 6, 2009, but was forced to prematurely cease its run in mid-January 2010 due to protests by animal-rights groups. He subsequently continued as one of the MCs on the replacement program Eco House, which deals with global climate change.

In 2010, Jung became the one of the hosts of SBS' live music show Inkigayo and variety-talk show Night After Night.  He left both programs in 2011.

In February 2010, he was paired with Seohyun of Girls' Generation as part of a virtually wedded couple for MBC's We Got Married. Collectively known as "YongSeo" couple, they filmed their final episode of the show on March 15, 2011. At the end of the year, Jung won the "Popularity Award" at the MBC Entertainment Awards for his stint in We Got Married.

In 2018, Jung joined the talk show Talk Mon alongside Kang Ho-dong as a host. However, he shortly left the program soon after he was involved in a controversy.

In 2020, Jung hosted the first season of the reality program, K-Trot in Town with Boom. The show aimed to introduce the genre of Korean Trot to people from other countries. However, due to the COVID-19 pandemic, the latter episodes focused on online busking events.

Personal life

Philanthropy
Jung has actively participated in charity events in the previous years including in the event held by BC Card in Seoul last May 2015.

He has released a song called You, My Star on December 23, 2013, dedicated to his fans. All the proceeds from this song have been donated to the FNC charity, Love FNC.

In December 2017, it has been reported that Jung has taken part in a public campaign for children with hearing disabilities run by Audiology Development Foundation in China. This campaign will help pay for the costs of education and other needs of children with hearing disabilities.

Jung held a two-day concert in March 2018 before he enlisted. All the profits in the said event will be donated.

He donated 50 million won to the Miral Welfare Foundation to celebrate this year's International Day of Disabled Persons on December 3. He requested that the donation will be used for the medical and living expenses of disabled children from low-income families.

He established a scholarship program at his alma mater, Namsan High School in Busan. He attended the graduation ceremony held on February 12, 2019, awarding six scholarships to selected graduates. He also donated to the school's development and will continuously do so.

Jung donated 20 million won for the victims of forest fires Gangwon Province through Hope Bridge National Disaster Relief Association. According to the organization, the donation will be used for the recovery of the damaged areas in Gangwon Province and support for the victims.

Controversy
On June 28, 2016, it was reported that Jung is being under investigation for insider trading. He was reportedly being investigated for allegedly earning approximately $347,000 through buying stocks in FNC Entertainment after learning about their plans to sign a major celebrity. On June 30, Jung was cleared of suspicion and was found not guilty. On October 31, FNC Entertainment announced that they would take legal action against malicious rumors about the singer after being framed of insider trading.

On January 17, 2018, Jung was reported to have entered a Kyung Hee University graduate school program, despite failing to appear at two official interviews for graduate school entrance. It was later revealed that he attended the interview separately at his agency FNC Entertainment at the request of the professor in charge of student admission. Due to the controversy, Jung's admission was set to be revoked by Kyung Hee University despite having not broken any rules as the university itself has no clear rules regarding graduate student admission process, and that it's often up to the professor's discretion. Citizens’ Coalition for Democratic Media (CCDM) issued a press release criticizing SBS for targeting Jung in their report, calling it "exploitative" and "extremely inappropriate reporting by the media that runs the serious risk of human rights violations."

On October 9, 2018, FNC Entertainment announced that Jung had been cleared of all charges earlier that year. It was reported that Jung was not guilty of obstruction of business in regards to his school admissions. The prosecutor decided to not indict him in July. The law also acknowledged that Jung did not have any intention of receiving preferential admission.

Mandatory military service
Jung began his compulsory military service on March 5, 2018. He volunteered to be assigned in the 702nd Special Assault Regiment in II Corps on April 13, 2018. Jung was discharged from his military service on November 3, 2019.

Filmography

Film

Television series

Web series

Television show

Hosting

Radio shows

Discography

Studio albums
 One Fine Day (2015)
 Summer Calling (2017)
 Feel the Y's City (2020)

Concert tours

Solo Concert

Jung Yonghwa 1st Concert - One Fine Day (2015)
Jung Yonghwa Live [Summer Calling] (2017)
Jung Yonghwa Live [Room 622] (2018)
Jung Yong Hwa Live “Still 622” in Seoul (2019)
JUNG YONG HWA JAPAN CONCERT 2020 'WELCOME TO THE Y'S CITY (2022)
JUNG YONG HWA JAPAN CONCERT @X-MAS ~WELCOME TO THE Y'S CITY~  (2022)

Concert participation
2019 FNC KINGDOM -WINTER FOREST CAMP- (2019)

Awards and nominations

References

External links

 
 

 
21st-century South Korean male actors
English-language singers from South Korea
K-pop singers
FNC Entertainment artists
Japanese-language singers of South Korea
Musicians from Busan
Singers from Seoul
South Korean male idols
South Korean male singers
South Korean male film actors
South Korean male television actors
South Korean pop guitarists
South Korean pop rock singers
South Korean radio presenters
South Korean rhythm and blues singers
South Korean rock guitarists
South Korean television presenters
CNBLUE members
South Korean singer-songwriters
Living people
1989 births
Warner Music Japan artists
Male actors from Seoul
South Korean male singer-songwriters